Periergates is a genus of longhorn beetles of the subfamily Lamiinae, containing the following species:

 Periergates badeni Bates, 1885
 Periergates chiriquensis Bates, 1885
 Periergates rodriguezi Lacordaire, 1872

References

Onciderini